Renegade 2 may refer to
Target: Renegade, a 1988 computer game released by Ocean
Command & Conquer: Renegade 2, a computer game by Westwood Studios cancelled in 2003